Sheila Ann Manson McLean  (born 20 June 1951) is International Bar Association Professor of Law and Ethics in Medicine and director of the Institute of Law and Ethics in Medicine at the School of Law of the University of Glasgow. McLean is the Book Reviewers' Editor for Medical Law International.

Early life
Born Sheila Black, she was educated at the Glasgow High School for Girls and studied at the University of Glasgow, graduating LL.B. in 1972. She then worked as an Area Reporter for the Children's Panel, and in 1975 was appointed Lecturer at the School of Law of the University of Glasgow. She was awarded an M.Litt. in 1978, with a dissertation entitled The role of the reporter in the children's hearing system, and in 1987 completed her Ph.D., Information disclosure, consent to medical treatment and the law. She was appointed Senior Lecturer in 1985, and established the Institute of Law and Ethics in Medicine.

Career
In 1990, McLean was appointed the first International Bar Association Professor of Law and Ethics in Medicine, and has since pursued a distinguished research career. She has published widely, in particular on consent, reproductive and end of life issues. She authored a controversial book concerning the ethical future of applied genetic engineering, entitled Modern Dilemma : Choosing Children, and has spoken out with criticism of the Baby Gender Mentor test.

McLean has also held a number of appointments, both nationally and internationally. Currently, she is UK Adviser to the European branch of the World Health Organization on the revision of its Health for All policy, a member of the UNESCO Biomedical Ethics Committee, and Specialist Adviser to the House of Commons Science and Technology Select Committee. Between 1997 and 1998, she chaired the Department of Health review of consent provisions in the Human Fertilisation and Embryology Act 1990 and between 2000 and 2003, chaired the Independent Review Group on Organ Retention at Post Mortem. From 1999 to 2002, she was the first Chairman of the Scottish Criminal Cases Review Commission.

She has been awarded honorary degrees by the Universities of Abertay Dundee and Edinburgh, and Fellowships of the Academy of Medical Sciences, Royal Society of Edinburgh, Royal College of Physicians of Edinburgh, Royal College of General Practitioners and the Royal Society of Arts. She is also a distinguished supporter of Humanists UK.

McLean was appointed Officer of the Order of the British Empire (OBE) in the 2020 New Year Honours for services to health and education.

Personal life
She married Alan McLean in 1976, although the marriage was dissolved in 1987. She is a member of the Lansdowne Club.

References

External links
 Professor Sheila McLean, Staff Profile, University of Glasgow
getCITED profile
Interview discussing her book: Modern Dilemma: Choosing Children at the Edinburgh International Book Festival,

Living people
Scottish legal scholars
Scottish humanists
People educated at the High School of Glasgow
Alumni of the University of Glasgow
Academics of the University of Glasgow
Fellows of the Royal Society of Edinburgh
Scholars of medical law
1951 births
Officers of the Order of the British Empire